The 1978 La Flèche Wallonne was the 42nd edition of La Flèche Wallonne cycle race and was held on 20 April 1978. The race started and finished in Verviers. The race was won by Michel Laurent of the Peugeot team.

General classification

References

1978
1978 in road cycling
1978 in Belgian sport
April 1978 sports events in Europe
1978 Super Prestige Pernod